The Batalpashinsky otdel was a Cossack district (otdel) of the Kuban oblast of the Caucasus Viceroyalty of the Russian Empire. It bordered the Stavropol Governorate to the north, the Labinsky and Maykopsky otdels to the west, the Sochi and Sukhumi okrugs to the south, and the Terek Oblast to the east. The area of the Batalpashinsky otdel included most of the contemporary Karachay-Cherkessia region of Russia. The administrative capital was the city of Batalpashinskaya (present-day Cherkessk).

Administrative divisions 
The subcounties (uchastoks) of the Batalpashinsky otdel in 1912 were as follows:

Demographics

Russian Empire Census 
The plurality of the population indicated Russian to be their mother tongue, with significant Ukrainian and Karachay speaking minorities.

Kavkazskiy kalendar 

Notes

References

Bibliography 

Otdels of Kuban Oblast
Kuban Oblast
Caucasus Viceroyalty (1801–1917)
History of Kuban